Papeete (Tahitian: Papeete, pronounced ) is the capital city of French Polynesia, an overseas collectivity of the French Republic in the Pacific Ocean. The commune of Papeete is located on the island of Tahiti, in the administrative subdivision of the Windward Islands, of which Papeete is the administrative capital. The French High Commissioner also resides in Papeete.

It is the primary center of Tahitian and French Polynesian public and private governmental, commercial, industrial and financial services, the hub of French Polynesian tourism and a commonly used port of call. The Windward Islands are themselves part of the Society Islands. The name Papeete, sometimes also spelled Papeete in languages other than Tahitian, means "water from a basket". The urban area of Papeete had a total population of 136,771 inhabitants at the August 2017 census, 26,926 of whom lived in the commune of Papeete proper.

Geography

The commune of Papeete is subdivided into eleven quartiers (wards):

Climate
Papeete features a tropical monsoon climate (Am according to the Köppen climate classification) with a wet season and dry season, bordering a tropical rainforest climate, with high temperatures and humidity year round. However, precipitation is observed even during the city's dry season. The dry season is short, covering only the months of August and September. The rest of the year is wet, with the heaviest precipitation falling in the months of December and January. Sunshine is moderately high, as most precipitation comes as thunderstorms and cyclones, and doesn't last for long.

History of Papeete

In 1902, it became necessary to move the post office of Papeete to another location. Instead of demolishing it and rebuilding it at the new site, it was lifted from the subsoil and moved as a whole on a Decauville railway.

Paul Decauville mentioned in a letter to Governor Theodore Lacascade, dated 18 June 1891, an order for " of  portable rail tracks and about 12,000 francs of rolling stock, payable in three years," presumably for a tramway from Papeete to Punaauia operated by hand or animals.

At the outbreak of World War I Papeete was shelled by German vessels, causing loss of life and significant damage.

This was motivated, in particular, by the construction of the Faaā International Airport, the only international airport in French Polynesia, near Papeete. In 1983, The Church of Jesus Christ of Latter-day Saints built the Papeete Tahiti Temple here because of its large number of members in the region. On 5 September 1995 the government of Jacques Chirac conducted the first of a series of nuclear test detonations off the shores of Moruroa. A resulting riot in Papeete lasted for two days and damaged the international airport, injured 40 people, and scared away tourism for some time. Similar rioting had occurred after another French nuclear test in the same area in 1987.

Transportation 
The streets of the town center are very busy, and traffic can be a problem since they are very narrow. The Tahiti freeway starts close to the town center as Pōmare Boulevard, named after the Tahitian Royal Family of the 19th century. By air, passengers depart from the Faaā International Airport. Domestic interisland service is operated by Air Tahiti with international flights being operated by Air Tahiti Nui, Air France, LATAM Chile, United and other airlines. By sea, passengers can use a marine ferry service for travel to Moorea or a Bora Bora cruise line service for travel to Bora Bora.

Demographics
The urban area of Papeete had a total population of 136,771 inhabitants at the August 2017 census, 26,926 of whom lived in the commune of Papeete proper. The urban area of Papeete is made up of seven communes. They are listed from northeast to southwest:

 Mahina
 Arue
 Pirae
 Papeete (historically the most populous commune in the urban area, and still the administrative capital)
 Faaā (which became in 1988 the most populous commune in the urban area)
 Punaauia
 Paea

Historical population

Average population growth of the Papeete urban area:

 1956–1962: +1,107 people per year (+3.5% per year)
 1962–1971: +3,597 people per year (+7.6% per year)
 1971–1977: +2,025 people per year (+2.9% per year)
 1977–1983: +2,400 people per year (+2.9% per year)
 1983–1988: +2,158 people per year (+2.2% per year)
 1988–1996: +1,489 people per year (+1.4% per year)
 1996–2002: +1,873 people per year (+1.6% per year)
 2002–2007: +913 people per year (+0.7% per year)
 2007–2012: +386 people per year (+0.3% per year)
 2012–2017: +631 people per year (+0.5% per year)

Migrations
The places of birth of the 136,771 residents in the Papeete urban area at the 2017 census were the following (2007 census in parenthesis):

 72.5% were born in Tahiti (up from 68.4% at the 2007 census)
 11.3% in Metropolitan France (down from 12.8% at the 2007 census)
 6.2% in the Society Islands (other than Tahiti) (down from 6.8% at the 2007 census)
 2.9% in the Tuamotu-Gambier (down from 3.6% at the 2007 census)
 1.9% in the Marquesas Islands (down from 2.1% at the 2007 census)
 1.6% in the Austral Islands (down from 2.0% at the 2007 census)
 1.3% in the overseas departments and territories of France other than French Polynesia (0.9% in New Caledonia and Wallis and Futuna; 0.4% in the other overseas departments and collectivities) (down from 1.6% at the 2007 census)
 0.6% in Southeast Asia and East Asia (down from 0.7% at the 2007 census)
 0.4% in North Africa (most of them Pieds-Noirs) (down from 0.5% at the 2007 census)
 1.3% in other foreign countries (down from 1.5% at the 2007 census)

Languages
At the 2017 census, 98.4% of the population in the urban area of Papeete whose age was 15 years and older reported that they could speak French (up from 98.2% at the 2007 census). 96.7% reported that they could also read and write it (up from 96.5% at the 2007 census). Only 0.7% of the population whose age was 15 years and older had no knowledge of French (down from 1.2% at the 2007 census).

At the same census, 83.9% of the population in the urban area of Papeete whose age was 15 years and older reported that the language they spoke the most at home was French (up from 79.7% at the 2007 census). 13.5% reported that Tahitian was the language they spoke the most at home (down from 16.5% at the 2007 census). 1.2% reported another Polynesian language (down from 1.7% at the 2007 census), 0.9% reported a Chinese dialect (down from 1.6% at the 2007 census), half of whom speak Hakka, and 0.5% reported another language (same as in 2007).

19.8% of the population in the urban area of Papeete whose age was 15 years and older reported that they had no knowledge of any Polynesian language at the 2017 census (up from 19.5% at the 2007 census), whereas 80.2% reported that they had some form of knowledge of at least one Polynesian language (down from 80.5% at the 2007 census).

Travel and tourism

Traveling tourists arrive and depart Papeete via cruise ship at Papeete Harbor or domestic airline at Faaā International Airport, which was completed and opened in 1962.

Main sights

 The waterfront esplanade.
 Bougainville Park (once named Albert Park, in honour of a former Belgian king and World War One hero), is now named for Louis Antoine de Bougainville, the first French explorer to circumnavigate the globe.
 Cathedral of Notre Dame of Papeete.
 The Territorial Assembly is the heart of the Polynesian government and contains the Territorial Assembly building, the High Commissioner's residence and also a once popular clubhouse of Paul Gauguin. It was also once the site of the royal residence and palace of Queen Pōmare IV of Tahiti, who ruled from 1827 to 1877.
 Presidential palace.
 The Papeete Tahiti Temple of the Church of Jesus Christ of Latter-day Saints.
 The Monument to Pouvanaa a Oopa (a decorated World War I hero, Tahitian nationalist, and deputy to Paris for the Tahitian Territorial Assembly).
 The Mairie (town hall).
 Papeete Market.

In popular culture 
 The film El pasajero clandestino deals with several persons trying to take control of the inheritance of a recently deceased English film magnate, who travel to Papeete to look for the heir.
 Papeete is mentioned in the songs "Southern Cross" by Crosby, Stills & Nash and "Somewhere Over China" by Jimmy Buffett.
 Papeete is mentioned in Bruce Brown's surf film The Endless Summer as one of the surf sites visited by the two longboarders chasing the summer season around the world.  The beach at Papeete is dubbed "Ins and outs" because the steep shore causes waves to break in both directions—toward the beach and out to sea.
 The first chapter of Robert A. Heinlein's 1984 novel Job: A Comedy of Justice is set in Pape'ete. 
 Papeete is where Robert Louis Stevenson's "The Ebb Tide" begins.
 Papeete is a setting in Mutiny on the Bounty
 Papeete, a schooner built by Matthew Turner, who had extensive business interests in Tahiti, was known for a fast passage from San Francisco to Tahiti of 17 days.

Economy

Air Tahiti Nui has its head office in the Immeuble Dexter in Papeete.

Education
The Lycée Paul-Gauguin is located in the city.

Notable people 
 Chantal Galenon, politician and women's rights activist
 Unutea Hirshon, politician and activist

Gallery

See also
 Windward Islands (Society Islands)

Notes

Explanatory footnotes

Citations

General and cited references 
 Kay, Robert F. (2001). Hidden Tahiti. Berkeley, California: Ulysses Press. .

External links

 Papeete Official Website
 Papeete City Tour, over 30 tourist attractions to discover
 Papeete City Tour for mobile

 
1818 establishments in Tahiti
Capitals in Oceania
Communes of French Polynesia
Populated places established in 1818
Port cities in Oceania
Towns and villages in Tahiti